Moropus (meaning "slow foot") is an extinct genus of large perissodactyl ("odd-toed" ungulate) mammal in the chalicothere family. Moropus belonged to the schizotheriine subfamily of chalicotheres, and has the best fossil record of any member of this group; numbers of individuals, including complete skeletons, have been found.

The closest extant relatives of Moropus are other perissodactyls: horses, rhinos, and tapirs.

Description

Like other chalicotheres, Moropus differed from typical ungulates in having large claws, rather than hooves, on the feet. Three large, highly compressed claws on each front foot were supported inside by fissured bony phalanges, a structure similar to the large claws of ground sloths. The name Moropus translates to "slow (or sloth) foot", implying it was a clumsy mover. However, as with all schizotheriines, the articulation of the phalangeal (finger) bones shows that Moropus could retract the claws enough to walk smoothly with the front feet in a normal digitigrade stance, lifting the claws by hyperextension of the phalangeal hook.

Like other schizotheriines, the teeth were adapted to browsing, and the narrow skull with high nasal bones comes to a spoon-shaped tip, a characteristic common to leaf-eating mammals that browse selectively, grasping their food with mobile lips and a long tongue. The pelvis and hindlimbs would have allowed living individuals to rear up on their hind legs, using the front claws to hook tree branches and pull them within reach of the lips and tongue. Measurements of multiple individuals in at least one species (M. elatus) suggest there was sexual dimorphism, with one sex larger than the other.

Moropus was an uncommon animal in the woodland and savanna environments where it lived. However, at the Agate Springs bonebed in Nebraska, the remains of seventeen individuals were found in a thirty-six foot area, which suggests that in at least some situations Moropus came together in groups. The front and back legs of this genus were more similar in length than most advanced chalicotheres, which may indicate it was better adapted to life in more open environments, spending less time standing at trees and more time walking and running.

Fossil distribution
Phillips Ranch, Kern County, California estimated age: ~18.7 Mya.
Stewart Spring (UCMP 2027), Mineral County and Esmeralda County, Nevada estimated age: ~18.7 Mya.
Stage Hill I, aka Millennium's End Quarry, Scotts Bluff County, Nebraska estimated age: ~21.6—21.5 Mya.
Sucker Creek site, Sucker Creak Formation, Malheur County, Oregon ~16.4 Mya.
Anderson Ranch Formation, Agate Fossil Beds National Monument, Nebraska estimated age ~ 21.3-19.2 Mya.

Species distributions
 M. elatus - Colorado, Nebraska
 M. hollandi - Wyoming, Nebraska
 M. merriami - Nevada, Nebraska
 M. oregonensis - Oregon, Texas, Florida

References

Cambridge Journals Online, Journal of Zoology

Chalicotheres
Miocene odd-toed ungulates
Miocene mammals of North America
White River Fauna
Miocene genus first appearances
Fossil taxa described in 1877
Taxa named by Othniel Charles Marsh